Panagiotis Retelas was a Greek long-distance runner. He competed in the men's 5000 metres at the 1920 Summer Olympics.

References

Year of birth missing
Year of death missing
Athletes (track and field) at the 1920 Summer Olympics
Greek male long-distance runners
Olympic athletes of Greece
Place of birth missing